Portland College is an education establishment near Ravenshead, Nottinghamshire. Portland College has around 270 students aged between 16 and 60. It was established in 1949.

Foundation
The college was originally established as institution for the training for men who had been disabled through war injuries and for miners injured or made ill through working in that industry. The college was founded in 1949. The college's early development owed much to the energy, enthusiasm and vision of Winifred, Duchess of Portland. The Duchess had been inspired to act after regular visits to Harlow Wood Hospital near Mansfield in the 1940s. She shared a vision along with Doctor Alan Malkin an orthopaedic surgeon, to provide provision for the hope of retraining and re-employment of the patients after they had recovered and left the hospital.

In 1947 the Duke of Portland had transferred  of his land in Sherwood Forest to the Duchess's Charity through a deed of gift. A further  had been purchased for the sighting of the new college. Along with these moves a Workers Contributory Fund had been established which encouraged local Nottinghamshire employees to contribute one penny a week towards the £100,000 estimated to open the college. By 1948 some 17,000 workers had agreed to take part in the scheme and by 1949 a total of 20,000 workers were in the scheme. The Foundation stone was laid by the then Princess Elizabeth, the future Queen on 29 June 1949. By the end of the year £90,000 had been raised.

Building Begins
The Architect of Portland College was Thomas Nelson Cartwright of Evans, Cartwright and Woollatt. The buildings were designed with the needs of disabled people in mind. There were no stairs in the student areas, all doors were made wide enough for wheelchairs, and bathrooms and bedrooms were fitted with aids and adaptations. By early 1950 two accommodation blocks, a dining hall, workshops and the boiler house had been completed. Staff for the college had been recruited and in June 1950 the college opened its doors to its first students. On 24 July 1950 Her Majesty The Queen officially opened Portland College. The Cinema Museum in London holds excellent film of the occasion, Film HM0369.

Initial years: 1950 to 1969
The College was able to offer four courses to it initial intake of 18 students. These were gardening, bench carpentry, boot and shoe repair and surgical boot making, and clerical and commercial. These students included ex-miners and ex-servicemen and there disabilities ranged from quiescent tuberculosis and poliomyelitis to limb amputees. Despite their widely varying backgrounds, these students thrived in spite of being away from home in an environment that was conducive to discussion, debate and friendship helping each other with their problems and frustrations associated with all their disabilities. Throughout the 1950s the college went from strength to strength. In 1953 the Administration Block was opened. It had a close working relationship with the National Coal Board with efforts particular aimed at the mining communities. The college also became a vital link for disabled and handicapped school leavers supplying further education and the college commitments were extended to provide this along with vocational training. 1961 saw the first female students enrolled at the college. At this time new courses were introduced and these included shorthand and typing followed by course in electronic wiring and assembly, and industrial electronics. The college along with the Ministry of Labour developed a pilot sheltered employment project. Workshops on site produced and marketed its own line of gift local cut oak products with the theme of Sherwood Forest and local legendary hero Robin Hood.

1970 to 1989
The 1970s saw the college having to cope with the climate of high unemployment, high inflation and political turmoil. The rising inflation meant rising running costs, which in turn affected the funding from local education authorities. Further consequences were that ever urgent fundraising became more difficult. Nevertheless Portland College continued its improvements to its curriculum. An appeal to raise £80,000 to improve and extend the college's residential provisions and the education and vocation wings was successful. In 1975 the college introduced Literacy courses. A new concept in the teaching of Literacy was pioneered at the college by Don Price MBE, who was the Assistant Director of the college. Don and his wife Jeune invented the Portland Blend System in 1977. This teaching system was fundamental to great achievements by students at Portland and around the world. As a tried and proven improvement to the teaching of Literacy, this system attracted wide attention from the academic community and the system was marketed under the name 'Phonic Blend Systems Limited', with the college retaining a financial interest through an agreement on royalties. The later part of the seventies and early eighties saw the rapid increases in modern technology. The college soon saw the potential as training aids the newly installed computers and micro-writers in classrooms. By 1983 Portland saw a significant milestone when the 5,000th student passed through the college. In 1988 the college opened its Vocational Training Department's Technical Centre which provided students with courses in computing.

1990 to 1999
The new decade marked Portland's 40th anniversary and to celebrate this achievement Her Majesty The Queen and the Duke of Edinburgh visited the college in June 1990. the royal party spent the day at the college, presenting awards at the prize giving and Her Majesty also laid the foundation stone for a new residential unit which would eventually be called the 'laurels'. The Laurels was completed in 1992 which added new High-care accommodation for 60 residential learning skills students. The early years of the 1990s also saw a shift in the college's Vocational Department to competence based training with the National Vocation Qualifications, replacing the traditional examinations. In 1993 funds were raised to build Rowan Place independence units. The college's dining rooms were also upgraded and extended. In the College's Golden Jubilee Year a state of the arts hydrotherapy pool and fitness centre was added to Portland's excellent campus facilities. The 1990s also saw an increase in the numbers of students from around 200 at the beginning of the decade rising to 280 at any one time in 1999. By the new millennium over 8,000 students had now passed through Portland College.

2000 to the present
In the new millennium Portland faced new challenges with massive changes taking place in the education, care and inspection directives. In the Learning and skills Department, Essential Skills Programmes were enhanced with student placed into the programmes according to their individual needs and aspirations. The Employment Department saw the emphasize shift towards Information Technology-based training which it embraced. The college won a prestige's award for 'Best Local Academy for the year of 2000 in UK, Europe, Africa and the Middle East. For its work in its Cisco Academy. With this the college was accredited to become a regional Academy and has continued to offer excellent training opportunities for the students of Portland. The Karten Trust provide funds for the college's CTEC centre and this has been instrumental in giving students skills in Web Page Design and to create a Computer Aided Design program with student being able to access software and producing live work for both internal and external customers. The department has a record for securing employments for graduates of the College. In 2003 the college became Microsoft Office Specialist Authorized Testing Centre and with the Microsoft Academy giving students the opportunities for qualifications in the full range of Microsoft Programmes. After over half a century of steady growth, the number of students at Portland has stabilised in recent years to a level of between 250 and 300 students. With around 30 of these being day students from the surrounding area. The employment students attend the course on a steady roll–on-roll off basis rather than an academic year.

Information and Communication Technology learning centre

In 1997 the college Principal Mike Syms put together the concept of an Information and Communication Technology learning centre. By July 2006 the college had reached its fund raising target of £3.2 million and a further £370,000 for equipment and technology. In May 2004 the official ground breaking ceremony took place performed by HRH Prince Edward, Earl of Wessex. Just as his mother, the Queen, had laid the foundation stone for the college in 1949, Prince Edward carried out the unveiling of the foundation stone for the new centre almost 60 years later. The buildings Architects were Patel Taylor of London. The main construction contract was given to a local company Clegg Construction of Lace Market in Nottingham. Work commenced in May 2005 and the finished building was handed over in June 2006. The new building has ten teaching spaces. These teaching spaces include the IT Essentials Suite, Computer Aided Design Suite, CISCO and Microsoft Academies, Job Club and Transition Suite, Skills for Life/Learning Resource Suite, Alternative and Augmentative Communication (AAC) Suite, Learning and Skills Information Learning Technology Suite and a Research and Development Centre. There are also various meeting rooms and a new main reception. The new centre is furnished with equipment and furniture. There are specially designed desk with integrally fitted computers and interactive whiteboards and ceiling mounted projectors in some of the rooms. All the workstations have chairs.

References

External links
Portland College

Sixth form colleges in Nottinghamshire
Schools in Mansfield
Sherwood Forest